In mathematics, the Prouhet–Tarry–Escott problem asks for two disjoint multisets A and B of n integers each, whose first k power sum symmetric polynomials are all equal.
That is, the two multisets should satisfy the equations

for each integer i from 1 to a given k. It has been shown that n must be strictly greater than k.

This problem was named after Eugène Prouhet, who studied it in the early 1850s, and Gaston Tarry and Edward B. Escott, who studied it in the early 1910s. The problem originates from letters of Christian Goldbach and Leonhard Euler (1750/1751).

Examples

Ideal solutions 

An ideal solution for n = 6 is given by the two sets { 0, 5, 6, 16, 17, 22 }
and { 1, 2, 10, 12, 20, 21 }, because:

 01 + 51 + 61 + 161 + 171 + 221 = 11 + 21 + 101 + 121 + 201 + 211

 02 + 52 + 62 + 162 + 172 + 222 = 12 + 22 + 102 + 122 + 202 + 212

 03 + 53 + 63 + 163 + 173 + 223 = 13 + 23 + 103 + 123 + 203 + 213

 04 + 54 + 64 + 164 + 174 + 224 = 14 + 24 + 104 + 124 + 204 + 214

 05 + 55 + 65 + 165 + 175 + 225 = 15 + 25 + 105 + 125 + 205 + 215.

For n = 12, an ideal solution is given by A = {±22, ±61, ±86, ±127, ±140, ±151} and B = {±35, ±47, ±94, ±121, ±146, ±148}.

Other solutions 

Namely, partition the numbers from 0 to  into a) the numbers each with an even number of ones in its binary expansion and b) the numbers each with an odd number of ones in its binary expansion; then the two sets of the partition give a solution to the problem.
01 + 31 + 51 + 61 + 91 + 101 + 121 + 151 = 11 + 21 + 41 + 71 +  81 + 111 + 131 + 141
02 + 32 + 52 + 62 + 92 + 102 + 122 + 152 = 12 + 22 + 42 + 72 +  82 + 112 + 132 + 142
03 + 33 + 53 + 63 + 93 + 103 + 123 + 153 = 13 + 23 + 43 + 73 +  83 + 113 + 133 + 143.

Generalizations 
A higher dimensional version of the Prouhet–Tarry–Escott problem has been introduced and studied by Andreas Alpers and Robert Tijdeman in 2007: Given parameters , find two different multi-sets ,  of points from   such that

for all  with  This problem is related to discrete tomography and also leads to special Prouhet-Tarry-Escott solutions over the Gaussian integers (though solutions to the Alpers-Tijdeman problem do not exhaust the Gaussian integer solutions to Prouhet-Tarry-Escott).

 and

.

See also
 Euler's sum of powers conjecture
 Beal's conjecture
 Jacobi–Madden equation
 Lander, Parkin, and Selfridge conjecture
 Taxicab number
 Pythagorean quadruple
 Sums of powers, a list of related conjectures and theorems
 Discrete tomography

Notes

References
 Chap.11.
.

External links

Diophantine equations
Mathematical problems